The 2008 Players Championship was a golf tournament in Florida on the PGA Tour, held  at TPC Sawgrass in Ponte Vedra Beach, southeast of Jacksonville. It was the 35th Players Championship  and was won by Sergio García,  in a sudden-death playoff over Paul Goydos.

Defending champion Phil Mickelson finished nine strokes back, in a tie for 21st place.

Venue

Course layout

Field
Michael Allen, Robert Allenby, Stephen Ames, Stuart Appleby, Ryan Armour, Tommy Armour III, Woody Austin, Aaron Baddeley, Briny Baird, Brian Bateman, Cameron Beckman, Rich Beem, Jason Bohn, Bart Bryant, Jonathan Byrd, Ángel Cabrera, Mark Calcavecchia, Chad Campbell, Michael Campbell, Paul Casey, Alex Čejka, K. J. Choi, Daniel Chopra, Stewart Cink, Tim Clark, José Cóceres, Fred Couples, Ben Crane, Ben Curtis, Brian Davis, Chris DiMarco, Luke Donald, Ken Duke, Steve Elkington, Ernie Els, Bob Estes, Niclas Fasth, Steve Flesch, Fred Funk, Jim Furyk, Sergio García, Robert Garrigus, Brian Gay, Lucas Glover, Mathew Goggin, Retief Goosen, Jason Gore, Paul Goydos, Nathan Green, Mathias Grönberg, Bill Haas, Todd Hamilton, Søren Hansen, Pádraig Harrington, Dudley Hart, J. P. Hayes, J. J. Henry, Mark Hensby, Tim Herron, Charley Hoffman, J. B. Holmes, Charles Howell III, Ryuji Imada, Freddie Jacobson, Miguel Ángel Jiménez, Dustin Johnson, Richard S. Johnson, Zach Johnson, Matt Jones, Jerry Kelly, Anthony Kim, Greg Kraft, Cliff Kresge, Matt Kuchar, Bernhard Langer, Stephen Leaney, Tom Lehman, Justin Leonard, Peter Lonard, Davis Love III, Steve Lowery, Jeff Maggert, Hunter Mahan, John Mallinger, Steve Marino, Shigeki Maruyama, Troy Matteson, Billy Mayfair, George McNeill, Rocco Mediate, John Merrick, Shaun Micheel, Phil Mickelson, Ryan Moore, Kevin Na, Sean O'Hair, Nick O'Hern, Joe Ogilvie, Geoff Ogilvy, José María Olazábal, Jeff Overton, Rod Pampling, Jesper Parnevik, Pat Perez, Tom Pernice Jr., Kenny Perry, Tim Petrovic, Carl Pettersson, Ian Poulter, Brett Quigley, Jeff Quinney, John Rollins, Andrés Romero, Justin Rose, Rory Sabbatini, Adam Scott, John Senden, Vijay Singh, Heath Slocum, Brandt Snedeker, Kevin Stadler, Henrik Stenson, Richard Sterne, Steve Stricker, Kevin Sutherland, Vaughn Taylor, Nicholas Thompson, David Toms, D. J. Trahan, Bo Van Pelt, Scott Verplank, Camilo Villegas, Johnson Wagner, Charles Warren, Nick Watney, Bubba Watson, Boo Weekley, Mike Weir, Lee Westwood, Brett Wetterich, Charlie Wi, Tim Wilkinson, Dean Wilson, Mark Wilson

Round summaries

First round
Thursday, May 8, 2008

Source:

Second round
Friday, May 9, 2008

Source:

Third round
Saturday, May 10, 2008

Source:

Final round
Sunday, May 11, 2008

In windy conditions, the final pairing struggled on the final day; overnight leader Paul Goydos managed a 2-over-par 74, whilst Kenny Perry crashed to an 81 (+9). In the groups ahead, the pairing of Jeff Quinney and Sergio García produced some of the best golf of the day, and García became the clubhouse leader at 5-under-par 283. Goydos still led, but missed a  par putt to win on the final hole, forcing a sudden-death playoff.

Scorecard
Final round

Cumulative tournament scores, relative to par
{|class="wikitable" span = 50 style="font-size:85%;
|-
|style="background: Pink;" width=10|
|Birdie
|style="background: PaleGreen;" width=10|
|Bogey
|style="background: Green;" width=10|
|Double bogey
|style="background: Olive;" width=10|
|Triple bogey+ 
|}
Source:

Playoff 
At the first playoff hole, the infamous par-3 17th, Goydos' went first and his tee shot found water. Garcia stayed dry, stopping  from the pin and the playoff was essentially over. Goydos finished the hole with a double bogey to give Garcia three putts to win; he two-putted for par and the title. It was the first playoff at the Players Championship since 1987 and the first to start at the 17th hole.

References

External links
The Players Championship website
Full results
Tournament Summary

2008
2008 in golf
2008 in American sports
2008 in sports in Florida
May 2008 sports events in the United States